Mina Khun (also Romanized as Mīnā Khūn; also known as Mīnākhū) is a village in Barakuh Rural District, Jolgeh-e Mazhan District, Khusf County, South Khorasan Province, Iran. At the 2006 census, its population was 121, in 29 families.

References 

Populated places in Khusf County